The Meridian Female College was a female seminary, founded in 1865 in Meridian, Mississippi by members of the Mississippi Baptist Convention.

History
The school was founded in 1865 by Rev. John B. Hamberlin.  Hamberlin ran the school until 1872, when he was succeeded by L. M. Stone.  By 1904 the school had closed.

See also
 Women's colleges in the United States
 Timeline of women's colleges in the United States

References

Baptist Christianity in Mississippi
Defunct private universities and colleges in Mississippi
Former women's universities and colleges in the United States
Educational institutions established in 1865
Female seminaries in the United States
Education in Lauderdale County, Mississippi
History of women in Mississippi
1865 establishments in Mississippi